{{Infobox person
| name               = Leah O'Rourke
| caption            =
| birth_date         = 
| birth_place        = Newry, County Down, Northern Ireland
| occupation         = Actor
| television         = {{nowrap|Derry Girls}}
}}

Leah O'Rourke (born 12 November 1988) is an Irish actor. She is best known for her role as Jenny Joyce in the Channel 4 comedy series, Derry Girls. Career 
O'Rourke rose to prominence in 2018 following her supporting role in the comedy series, Derry Girls.Outside of Derry Girls, O'Rourke has appeared in several short films, including Wasted (2013), Anna (2013), and Normality (2014). In 2016 O'Rourke played the character of Siobhán in the award-winning film Half Brothers. O'Rourke has spoken about how she auditioned for the role of 'Marianne' in the critically acclaimed drama series, Normal People'', but lost out to eventual-star, Daisy Edgar-Jones.

Aside from acting professionally, O'Rourke has also worked as a drama tutor in the Fermanagh School of Music and Performing Arts.

In 2023, O'Rourke took part as a contestant on the sixth series of Dancing with the Stars, paired with John Nolan.

Filmography

References

External links 
 

1988 births
Living people
People from Newry